Jamie McDonald or MacDonald may refer to:

 Jamie McDonald (adventurer) (born 1986), first British man to run the breadth of Canada
 Jamie McDonald (media personality) (born 1978), Australian Big Brother contestant and media personality
 Jamie McDonald (rugby league) (born 1977), Australian rugby league player
 Jamie MacDonald (bowls), lawn bowler from Jersey
 Jamie MacDonald (Finnish comedian), Canadian-born Finnish comedian
 Jamie MacDonald (footballer) (born 1986), Scottish football goalkeeper
 Jamie MacDonald, a fictional character in the BBC TV series Monarch of the Glen

See also 
 James MacDonald (disambiguation)